Bäckaby is a small village south of Vetlanda in the southern Swedish province of Småland. Bäckaby has a stone church, a kindergarten, a summer café and a small hostel called Plymska Huset. Bäckaby has 232 inhabitants. Bäckaby's old church was a wooden church which was moved to Jönköping in 1902. Its oldest parts were from the 14th century. The church was burnt to the ground in 2000.

Populated places in Jönköping County